Arguineguín (Guanche for "quiet water") is one of the most populated towns along the south coast of Gran Canaria, Spain. A typical Canarian fishing village, it is home to many locals rather than being a tourist resort. In 2015 it had 2517 inhabitants. It is part of the municipality of Mogán and is located southwest of Las Palmas.

There are several bars and restaurants, the latter specialising in fresh fish caught the same day. Tuesday is market day (the largest on the island).  Arguineguín features a beach and a port.  Tourism is not as popular in Arguineguín as in the larger places as Maspalomas and Playa del Ingles. Holiday hotels, however, can be found in Arguineguín; Marino I, Dorado Beach, Club Puerto Atlantico, Sunwing Resort Arguineguín, Green Beach Hotel and Radisson Blu Resort to mention the larger ones.

Transportation
The harbour here hosts a ferry service to Puerto Rico de Gran Canaria and Puerto de Mogán whilst another popular way to reach the town from Puerto Rico de Gran Canaria is by trekking over the mountain between the two towns.

The town also lies on several public bus routes offering convenient service to other towns on the island.

Arguineguín is also served by an expressway (GC1) with a nearby interchange and a highway.

Notable people
Juan Carlos Valerón, international footballer
David Silva, international footballer
Aythami Artiles, international footballer

References

External links
Ayuntamiento de Mogán (in English, Spanish and German)
A local newspaper for Scandinavians (in Norwegian)
Iglesia de Noruega (den norske sjømannskirken) (in Norwegian)
Colegio de Noruega (den norske skolen) (in Norwegian)

Populated places in Gran Canaria